The Copa Merconorte was an international football competition organized by CONMEBOL from 1998 to 2001 by clubs from Bolivia, Colombia, Ecuador, Peru, and Venezuela and starting in 2000 clubs from the CONCACAF confederation were invited including Costa Rica, Mexico, and the United States. The competition ran alongside the Copa Mercosur—based on the actual Mercosur economic pact between Argentina, Brazil, Paraguay and Uruguay. 

Teams did not directly qualify for this competition. Instead, the aim was to generate profits through the television contracts by inviting the most marketable clubs from each country.  Therefore, participation was based on invitation of individual clubs.

The competition—along with the Copa Mercosur—was discontinued following the conclusion of 2001. A football competition to be called the Copa Pan-Americana would replace these two competitions for the 2002 season featuring clubs from both CONMEBOL and CONCACAF. The competition was postponed, with plans to be played in 2003. Instead, a CONMEBOL competition was founded dubbed as the Copa Sudamericana in 2002. The Copa Pan-Americana was never organized in the immediate future and leaving the Sudamericana as the successor of the Copa Merconorte and Copa Mercosur.

All four editions were won by a Colombian club. Atlético Nacional won it on two occasions (1998 and 2000). All the finalists in the first three editions were Colombian. In the fourth edition, Emelec became the first and only non-Colombian club to reach the finals of the Copa Merconorte.

Format

Qualification
Teams did not directly qualify for this competition through their national leagues. Participation was based solely on invitation.

Tournament
The 1998 and 1999 editions were played with twelve teams of the five corresponding CONMEBOL nations. The twelve teams were divided into three groups and each team meets the others in its group home and away in a round-robin format. The group winners and the best runner-up advanced to a semifinal stage. The semifinals were played over two legs and the winners advanced to the finals which were also played over two legs. In 1999, the Bolivian teams played a qualifying playoff before the first phase of Copa Merconorte.

The 2000 and 2001 editions were expanded to sixteen teams and divided into four groups. With the expansion of another group, only the group winners advanced to the semifinals.

Distribution
The invitations and distribution of berths over the four seasons were as follows.

Finals

Performances

By club

By country

See also
 Copa Mercosur
 Copa Sudamericana
 Copa CONMEBOL

References

External links
 Copa Merconorte at RSSSF
 Copa Sudamericana at RSSSF
 Copa Pan-Americana at RSSSF
 South America - Other Copas at RSSSF

 
International club association football competitions in North America